Jackson Township is one of the twelve townships of Vinton County, Ohio, United States.  The 2010 census found 741 people in the township.

Geography
Located in the northern part of the county, it borders the following townships:
Benton Township, Hocking County: north
Swan Township: east
Elk Township: southeast
Richland Township: south
Harrison Township: southwest corner
Eagle Township: west
Salt Creek Township, Hocking County: northwest

No municipalities are located in Jackson Township, but it does contain the unincorporated community of Stella.

Name and history
Jackson Township was organized in 1831.

It is one of thirty-seven Jackson Townships statewide.

Government
The township is governed by a three-member board of trustees, who are elected in November of odd-numbered years to a four-year term beginning on the following January 1. Two are elected in the year after the presidential election and one is elected in the year before it. There is also an elected township fiscal officer, who serves a four-year term beginning on April 1 of the year after the election, which is held in November of the year before the presidential election. Vacancies in the fiscal officership or on the board of trustees are filled by the remaining trustees.

References

External links
Vinton County Chamber of Commerce 

Townships in Vinton County, Ohio
Townships in Ohio